Peter Joseph Wysocki (October 3, 1948 – June 14, 2003) was an American football linebacker who played his entire six-year career with the Washington Redskins from 1975 to 1980 in the National Football League (NFL). Wysocki previously played four seasons in the Canadian Football League (CFL) for the Hamilton Tiger-Cats, Toronto Argonauts and Saskatchewan Roughriders.

Early life
Wysocki was born in Detroit, Michigan and attended Garden City East High School.

College career
Wysocki attended and played college football at Western Michigan University. In 1968, he was a second-team All-Mid-American Conference selection. He was named to the Western Michigan Broncos football All-Century Team in 2005.

Professional career

CFL
After going undrafted, Wysocki played for four seasons in the Canadian Football League for the Hamilton Tiger-Cats, Toronto Argonauts and Saskatchewan Roughriders. In his final season with the Roughriders, he was named a CFL All-Star.

NFL
After a successful career in the CFL, Wysocki was signed in 1975 by the Washington Redskins of the National Football League. He was the third CFL player signed by Redskins head coach George Allen, the other two being Joe Theismann and Moses Denson. Wysocki played his entire six-year NFL career with the Redskins. In 88 games, he recovered three fumbles and intercepted one pass. Pete was a force on the special teams and was called "The Missile."

After football
After retiring from football, Wysocki became an advertising salesman for WMAL. He then became a successful real estate broker in Washington, D.C. He also worked at Transwestern as Vice President of Office Leasing. During his tenure at Transwestern, Wysocki was recognized by the Washington Association of Realtors for the Commercial Transaction of the Year in 1988 and won the Top Producer award from the Washington Area Commercial Brokers Council in 1991.

Personal life
Wysocki was married twice. In 1999, he was diagnosed with non-Hodgkin's lymphoma. After intensive chemotherapy, he became a public speaker regarding his illness, and spoke at Leukemia Society functions and similar organizations to help raise money for research. He died in 2003 in Vienna, Virginia.

References

External links

Wysocki Tackles His Most Formidable Foe, San Francisco Chronicle

1948 births
2003 deaths
Deaths from cancer in Virginia
Deaths from non-Hodgkin lymphoma
Hamilton Tiger-Cats players
Players of American football from Detroit
Saskatchewan Roughriders players
Toronto Argonauts players
Washington Redskins players
Western Michigan Broncos football players